The Tanah Merah Ferry Terminal is a ferry terminal in Singapore, located at Changi. The terminal serves ferry services to the Indonesian islands of Batam and Bintan, and Desaru, in Johor, Malaysia. It is owned and managed by Singapore Cruise Centre.

History
The terminal was constructed in 1995 at a cost of S$29 million with the intention of boosting tourism. The terminal began operations on 26 August. In 2007, the terminal, along with the Singapore Cruise Centre, received a $2.5 million IT upgrade, along with a $3 million facelift.

In 2010, bus service 570 was introduced to carry passengers between the terminal and Tanah Merah MRT station and Bedok MRT station. Bus service 35 has since replaced it.

On 25 November 2016, a 54-year old woman named Maimunah Awang, who worked as a cleaner at the terminal, was found dead in a drain at the ferry terminal compound. A 23-year old Malaysian man was subsequently charged with her murder. The man, identified as Ahmad Muin Yaacob, was a colleague of Maimunah. He was found guilty of murder and sentenced to life imprisonment and eighteen strokes of the cane in November 2020.

On 21 June 2022, the Maritime and Port Authority of Singapore announced that they have approved ferry services between the terminal and Desaru Coast Ferry Terminal in Johor, Malaysia. Ferry services to Desaru Coast began on 7 July 2022 and is operated by Desaru Link Ferry Services.

References

Ports and harbours of Singapore
Piers in Singapore
Ferry terminals in Singapore